Dead Cities, Red Seas & Lost Ghosts (stylised as DeadCities,RedSeas&LostGhosts) is the second studio album by the French electronic group M83. The album was first released in Europe on 14 April 2003, then in North America on 27 July 2004. The cover art is the photograph Snow Angels by Justine Kurland. This album was founding member Nicolas Fromageau's last album with the band.

The North American pressing of the album comes with a bonus disc, containing five additional tracks, including the title track of the album and a live version of "Gone", as well as the enhanced videos of the singles "Run into Flowers" and "America".

Reception

Dead Cities, Red Seas & Lost Ghosts has received widespread critical acclaim. At Metacritic, which assigns a normalised rating out of 100 to reviews from mainstream critics, the album received an average score of 86, based on 15 reviews, which indicates "universal acclaim".

In August 2009, Pitchfork placed Dead Cities, Red Seas & Lost Ghosts at number 188 on their list of the "Top 200 Albums of the 2000s". As of 2005 close to 25,000 copies of Dead Cities, Red Seas & Lost Ghosts had been sold in the United States.

Track listing

Standard track listing

Notes
The sampled dialogue in "America" comes from the film Don't Look Now.

Vinyl track listing
Vinyl issues of this album came with an extra track, a nearly 18-minute long piece named "Dead Cities, Red Seas & Lost Ghosts".

Charts

References

2003 albums
M83 (band) albums
Mute Records albums
Shoegaze albums by French artists